Alessandro François (1796–1857) was an Italian archaeologist. He was also a scholar, artist, engineer, and war commissioner of the Grand Duke of Tuscany in the mid-19th century.

Biography 

Throughout his life, François undertook a number of occupations, including as a mining engineer. After travelling widely in his youth, François decided in 1825 to excavate Etruscan sites, including Cosa, Cortona, Volterra, Fiesole, Vetulonia, Populonia, Chiusi and Vulci. He discovered several black-figure vase fragments in 1844 at Fonte Rotelle near Chiusi. He discovered more fragments in 1845, and the pieces were assembled into a complete vase of the highest quality, subsequently named after him, which was purchased by Leopold II, Grand Duke of Tuscany, in 1846 for the Uffizi Gallery.

In 1857, François discovered a spectacular painted Etruscan tomb, which has also been named after him.

François created his own excavation society and kept his finds in his home in Florence. Numerous attempts to found a museum to house his finds failed, despite his appealing to potential sponsors in Italy and to the French government.  François fell ill and died in 1857. He left no published writing.

Discoveries

The François Vase 

François found the large Attic volute krater in 1844 near Chiusi in one of his most famous excavations, and it takes its name from him. This masterpiece of black-figure pottery  is the work of Ergotimos (potter) and Kleitias (painter), and is dated to circa 560-550 BCE.

The François Tomb 

Another important find by François was the Etruscan tomb at Vulci, Lazio which also takes his name. The tomb is decorated with paintings representing battles between Romans and Etruscans, and scenes of execution of Trojan prisoners. One of the figures in the tomb represents Mastarna (a legendary figure whom the Emperor Claudius identified with Servius Tullius).

References

Bibliography 
 Il vaso François (The François Vase), Antonio Minto, Firenze, Leo Olschki, 1960
 François, Alessandro, Encyclopedia of the History of Classical Archaeology, Nancy Thomson de Grummond, ed. Westport, CT: Greenwood Press, 1996, vol. 1, pp. 461–62

External links 

Italian archaeologists
Archaeologists from Florence
Linguists of Etruscan
1796 births
1857 deaths